Bhusni is a village in Maharashtra, India. It is located in Umarga Taluka in Osmanabad district. The village resides in the Marathwada region, and falls under the supervision of the Aurangabad division. Located 75 km towards east from the district headquarters Osmanabad, the village is also 10 km from Umarga and 478 km from the state capital Mumbai.

Demographics 
The main language spoken here is Kannada. According to the 2011 Census, the total population of Bhusni village is 2984 and number of houses are 588. The population of female citizens is 66% and the rate of female literacy is 28%.

Nearby villages 

murum is 5 km away
chincholi bhuyar is 3 km away
 Naiknagar is 4 km away
 Murli is 4 km away
 Kantekur is 6 km away
 Kader is 5 km away
 Aurad is 6 km away

Bhusni is surrounded by Åland taluka towards south, Lohara taluka towards north, Nilanga taluka towards north, Tuljapur taluka towards west.

Nearby cities 
The cities near to Bhusni are Umarga, Tuljapur, Nilanga, Gulbarga.

Postal details 
The postal head office for Bhusni is MURUM. The pin code of Bhusni is 413605.

Politics 
The National Congress Party (NCP), Shiv Sena, SHS and INC are the major political parties in Bhusni.

Polling stations near Bhusni 

 Z.P.P.S CHINCHOLI BHUYAR south side
 Z.P.P.S KADER NORTH side
 Z.P.P.S BHUSANI east side
 Z.P.P.S GUNJOTI east side
 Z.P.P.S MURUM WEST SIDE

Education 
The colleges near Bhusni are:

 s.m.p.college murum
 Shri Sharadchandraji Pawar Junior college Naichakur
 National Backward Agriculture Education Information Technology Osmanabad
 Sevagram college
 Sevagram college, Kawatha

The schools in Bhusni are:

 Pratibha Niketan Vidyalaya
 Z.P.C.P school

References 

Villages in Osmanabad district